The 2012 Skate Canada International was the second event of six in the 2012–13 ISU Grand Prix of Figure Skating, a senior-level international invitational competition series. It was held at the WFCU Centre in Windsor, Ontario on October 26–28. Medals were awarded in the disciplines of men's singles, ladies' singles, pair skating, and ice dancing. Skaters earned points toward qualifying for the 2012–13 Grand Prix Final.

Eligibility
Skaters who reached the age of 14 by July 1, 2012 were eligible to compete on the 2012 senior Grand Prix circuit.

Prior to competing in a Grand Prix event, skaters were required to have earned the following scores(3/5 of the top scores at the 2012 World Championships):

Entries
The entries were as follows.

Mary Beth Marley / Rockne Brubaker withdrew from the pairs event due to the end of their partnership and Katarina Gerboldt / Alexander Enbert withdrew due to injury.

Overview
Georgia's Elene Gedevanishvili won the ladies' short program by 0.24 points ahead of Canada's Kaetlyn Osmond, with Russia's Ksenia Makarova in third. Kaetlyn Osmond won the competition, but Japan's Akiko Suzuki won the free skate, climbing up from fifth to take the silver, while Japanese teammate Kanako Murakami won the bronze.

Germany's Aliona Savchenko / Robin Szolkowy took the lead in the pairs' event, almost eight points ahead of Canada's Meagan Duhamel / Eric Radford, while Italy's Stefania Berton / Ondrej Hotarek rounded out the top three after the short program. The standings remained the same after the free skate, with the Germans winning by over 21 points over the Canadians, while the Italians finishing 18 points behind in bronze. Szolkowy wore tights which the ISU does not allow for men, however, the judges decided not to impose a costume deduction.

Spain's Javier Fernández placed first in the men's short program, three points ahead of Canada's Patrick Chan and Japan's Nobunari Oda. Fernandez continued his lead, winning the competition decisively by ten points over the reigning two-time World Champion, with Oda taking the bronze.

Canada's Tessa Virtue / Scott Moir edged out Italy's Anna Cappellini / Luca Lanotte by 0.01 points to win the short dance, with Russians Ekaterina Riazanova / Ilia Tkachenko nine points behind in third. The standings remained the same after the free, with the Canadians winning by over nine points over the Italians and the Russians 17 points behind in third.

Results

Men

Ladies

Pairs

Ice dancing

References

External links
 Result details at the International Skating Union
 Entries at the International Skating Union
 Event website at Skate Canada

Skate Canada International, 2012
Skate Canada International
Skate Canada International, 2012
Skate Canada International, 2012
Skate Canada International, 2012
Sports competitions in Windsor, Ontario